Amirabad-e Pain (also Romanized as Amīrābād-e Pā’īn; also known as Amīrābād, Amīrābād-e Soflá, and Amir Abad Sofla) is a village in Hoseynabad Rural District, Esmaili District, Anbarabad County, Kerman Province, Iran. At the 2006 census, its population was 146, in 27 families.

References 

Populated places in Anbarabad County